Tilla Jogian (Punjabi and ) is an abandoned Hindu temple and monastic complex located on the summit of the Tilla Jogian mountain in the Salt Range of Pakistan's Punjab province.

The complex was the most important centre for Hindu jogis in Punjab prior to 1947, and had housed hundreds of ascetics. The site is also important in Sikhism for its association with the founder of the Sikh faith, Guru Nanak.

Location
The Tilla Jogian complex is located on Pakistan's Potohar plateau, approximately 25 km west of the cities of Jhelum and Dina. The complex is located near the Jhelum River and the Grand Trunk Road – the ancient route which connected Central Asia to India. Tilla Jogian is also near the Rohtas Fort, and the Katas Raj Temples – another important Hindu pilgrimage site with a sacred pond that is said to have been created from the teardrops of the Hindu god Shiva.

Tilla Jogian complex is located in Pakistan's Salt Range, on a mountaintop of the same name. The temples are located at an altitude of 975 meters (3200 ft) near the summit of the mountain, resulting in a cooler and wetter climate relative to the Punjab plains. The complex is located in an area that is forested with olive trees, pines, and Acacia modesta.

History

The Kanphata jogi, an ascetic order noted for its members' ear piercings, was founded by Guru Gorakhnath, and was centred at Tilla Jogian.

Tilla Jogian's importance as a Hindu pilgrimage centre attracted the founder of Sikh faith, Guru Nanak who meditated here for 40 days in the early 1500s, since he wanted to understand the ideology of the jogis, and also debate with them regarding their core beliefs. The Mughal Emperor Akbar visited the "Shrine of Balnath," an influential and widely venerated yogi. The shine was noted by his chronicler Abul Fazal to be "so old" that its origins had become obscure, and that Akbar expressed marvel at the site's old age. The 17th century emperor, Jahangir, also visited the temple complex. Following the collapse of Mughal rule, the complex was sacked and looted by the Pashtun king Ahmad Shah Abdali, during one of his several raids into Punjab. The complex was quickly rebuilt following Abdali's defeat.

Maharaja Ranjit Singh in the late 19th century commemorated the visit of Guru Nanak with the construction of a stone-lined pond, and construction of a small monument to mark the exact spot at which Guru Nanak is said to have usually meditated.

During the British Raj, the local deputy commissioner built a bungalow at the site, having been attracted to the site for its cooler weather. The site was considered the most important pilgrimage site for jogis in Punjab prior to the Partition of British India in 1947. Immediately prior to Partition, an annual festival took place on the first day of the Hindu month of Chaitra, during which communal meals were served to all attendees.

Abandonment
Following Partition, most of the area's Hindu population migrated to the newly independent Republic of India, abandoning the temples which remain neglected until present day. The last priest of the complex was Samandnath Jogi. When riots erupted after Partition, Samandnath Jogi reportedly appointed a local village official as caretaker of the site, and instructed him to approach the deputy commissioner to auction off the temple's belongings if the Jogi did not return from India within 6 months. The local official then arranged a police escort for the Jogi to safely reach the local train station, in order to proceed onwards to Kangra, India. The Jogi did not return within the 6-month time frame, and so the temple's meagre belongings were auctioned.

Significance
The site was considered the most important pilgrimage site for jogis in Punjab and was home to hundreds of jogis prior to Partition. Tilla Jogian once also was home to a Brahminical seminary surrounded by extensive residential areas.

Heer Ranjha
Tilla Jogian is mentioned in the Punjabi poem Heer Ranjha, written by Waris Shah in 1766. Deedho Ranjha, the story's protagonist, who when spending his time on the rebound from heartbreak, sublimating his love and passion in the spiritual world, came here for consolation to his former love. He had his ears pierced here, following the tradition of Guru Goraknath's followers.

Site layout
Tilla Jogian comprises a complex of Hindu Hindu temples housing at least three baths and a network of waterworks with at least two minor dams.

Access
There are no developed pathways which lead to the complex – visitors must hike and bikers can ride on dirtbikes or trails to the top of the mountain in order to reach the site. Near the top is an old stone pathway named the Poorhiwaala Rah which leads to the temples, after passing the Ratti Banni ravine. There are number of walking trails to reach at the top: one from Rohtas Fort side and the other from Sanghoi, on the Jhelum River side.

Conservation

Local villagers have scoured the site in order to find coins and souvenirs to sell to visitors. Vandals have also damaged the site, including the monument built by Ranjit Singh to mark the spot where Guru Nanak meditated. As of 2012, the site has become overgrown by olive trees, resulting is a gradual destruction of the site.

See also

 Tilla Satellite Launch Center – nearby missile testing centre
 Katas Raj Temples – nearby former Hindu pilgrimage site. Said to be home of a pond created by the teardrops of Shiva
 Rohtas Fort – nearby 16th century Fort that is inscribed as a UNESCO World Heritage Site
 Hinduism in Pakistan
 Panchmukhi Hanuman Temple

References

External links
 Trekking on the Tilla Jogian by Shaikh Muhammad Ali
 Tilla Jogian picture travelogue
 Tilla Jogian destruction of 1st century BC heritage of Pakistan

Shiva temples
History of Pakistan
Ruins in Pakistan
Hindu temples in Punjab, Pakistan
Jhelum
1st-century BC Hindu temples